

Catocala junctura, the joined underwing or Stretch's underwing, is a moth in the family Erebidae. The species was first described by Francis Walker in 1858. It is found throughout temperate North America, ranging from New York and Pennsylvania west to Montana, Colorado, Oklahoma, Arizona, and into Texas, and north to southern Illinois, extreme southern Alberta and Saskatchewan; it has also been recorded west of the Rocky Mountains from California and south-eastern British Columbia. It is typically found near water, where the food plants of its caterpillar larvae grow plentifully.

Description and ecology

The wingspan is 70–75 mm or more. The forewings are grayish to brownish with prominent black bands above, and whitish below. The upperside of the hindwings is orange red, with two roughly concentric blackish bands on each wing, and lacking hairs at the base. The outer band separates a margin that is lighter in color than the rest of the upper hindwing. The inner band does not reach the trailing edge; its hindward tip forms a hook which points back at the wing base, or almost so. The underside of the hindwings is whitish along the leading edge; the trailing three-quarters of the wing are orange red. The inner black band is present on the underwings also. As in many relatives, the foreleg tibia of this species possess no spines, while the tarsi carry three rows of spines.

Adults are on the wing from June to September depending on the location. There is probably one generation per year. The caterpillars feed on willow species (Salix) and – in the west of their range – Fremont cottonwood (Populus fremontii).

Classification
This moth is placed in the subfamily Catocalinae, either of the owlet moth family, Noctuidae, or – if the Noctuidae are circumscribed more strictly – of family Erebidae. Within the Catocalinae, it belongs to tribe Catocalini and – if the Noctuidae are circumscribed widely – subtribe Catocalina.

This species is probably related to other North American Catocala that feed on willow and cottonwood. If so, it is one of the rather few species of this radiation that ranges east of the Rocky Mountains.

Synonyms
In the past, the name Catocala aspasia had often been used for this species, but actually it seems to refer to the rather similar C. electilis.

Many taxa described as distinct species or subspecies have recently been merged with C. junctura, and are considered mere forms without taxonomic rank; the alternate vernacular name "Stretch's underwing" in fact refers to one of these, the former C. stretchii. Not all authors have already adopted these changes, which are, however, probably warranted. The junior synonyms and other invalid taxa used for the joined underwing are thus:

 Catocala arizonae Grote, 1873
 Catocala arizonensis Strand, 1914
 Catocala aspasia sara French, 1883
 Catocala augusta H.Edwards, 1875
 Catocala elsa Beutenmüller, 1918
 Catocala huachuca Beutenmüller, 1918
 Catocala julietta French, 1916
 Catocala junctura augusta H.Edwards, 1875
 Catocala juncturana Strand, 1914
 Catocala juncturella Strand, 1914
 Catocala juncturelloides Strand, 1914
 Catocala margherita Beutenmüller, 1918
 Catocala portia H.Edwards, 1880
 Catocala roseata Cassino, 1919
 Catocala sara French, 1883
 Catocala stretchi (lapsus)
 Catocala stretchii Behr, 1870
 Catocala stretchii var. margherita Beutenmüller, 1918
 Catocala stretchii var. sierrae Beutenmüller, 1897
 Catocala walshi (lapsus)
 Catocala walshii Edwards, 1864

Footnotes

References

 (1983). "The Underwing Moths (Lepidoptera: Noctuidae) of Oklahoma" . Proceedings of the Oklahoma Academy of Science. 63: 60–67.

External links

Species info
Species info

junctura
Moths of North America
Moths described in 1858